Borders (UK) Ltd., also known as Borders & Books etc., was established as a Borders Group subsidiary in 1998, and in 2007 became independent of the US parent company. At its peak after separation from the US parent, it traded from its 41 Borders and 28 BOOKS etc. shops with over one million square feet of retail space, taking around 8% of the retail bookselling market. In 2008 and 2009 the store numbers were reduced before the collapse of the chain. They also operated one single branch in Ireland, but closed this early in 2009. On 26 November 2009 it was announced that Borders (UK) had gone into administration. All stores closed on 24 December 2009.

A typical Borders shop in the UK contained both a Paperchase stationery and Starbucks cafe concession. In addition, some branches also contained a RED5 gadget concession and GAME video games concession.

The logo contained both the Books etc. logo and the Borders logo to reflect the fact that Borders (UK) operated two different brands.  As of May 2022, Books Etc still operates as an independent family-run online business.

History

In September 2007, Borders (UK) Ltd. was acquired by Luke Johnson's London-based private equity investor Risk Capital Partners in a deal purportedly worth £20 million. Bookshop Acquisitions Ltd. - a subsidiary of Risk Capital Partners - was specifically set up for the purchase, and the deal included the right to use the Borders and Books etc. brand names consistent with the brand. Under the deal, Borders would receive an equity interest of about 17% in Bookshop Acquisitions.

David Roche stepped down as CEO of Borders (UK) in January 2008, and was replaced by the chain's former managing director, Philip Downer. Upon his appointment, Downer called for a category review of the entire company, although he made it clear there were no immediate plans to further change the structure of the business.

Subsequently, it was announced in March 2008 that Borders (UK) planned to close its distribution centre (based in Cornwall) on 29 August, in favour of having publishers and wholesalers deliver directly to its shops, this being exactly opposite to the decision of competitor Waterstones, which planned to test and open its own distribution centre, colloquially referred to as 'The Hub', from the end of May.

In July 2008, Borders launched an e-commerce website. In a bid to try to take back a share of internet sales of books, the beta testing of its new transactional website commenced, due for full completion before the end of the month. As of May 2022, Books Etc still operates as an independent family-run online business.

Borders sold eight London Books Etc. shops to Waterstones in August 2008, for an undisclosed sum.

Five Borders shops in Oxford Street, Llantrisant, Blanchardstown, Swindon and London Colney were closed in July 2009 and replaced by New Look. After July 2009, Borders was owned by Valco Capital Partners, part of Hilco, which specialises in distressed retailers.

At the end of September 2009, it was announced that the majority of the remaining Books Etc., and the two Borders Express shops, would be sold, and closing down sales began shortly after.

Administration
The company announced in November 2009 that it was looking for a buyer for the business following concerns that it would run out of money. The following day the Borders website stopped taking orders for books, while orders for CDs and DVDs through the Borders Entertainment website continued, for this was run by The Hut Group.

On 26 November 2009, Reuters announced that Borders (UK) had entered administration, after reportedly having difficulties raising enough cash to trade through the key Christmas period. This article was soon withdrawn, and replaced with a corrected item reporting that the company was 'mulling' administration. This news came on top of a difficult few weeks for the company, with the company reported to be on credit stop with all the major publishers, and (following the breakdown of negotiations with WHSmith) still searching for a buyer.

Later that day, Borders (UK) Ltd officially went into administration. Initially the intention was to appoint BDO as administrators, but it developed that a conflict of interest existed. Instead, MCR was appointed by Borders' owners—Valco Capital Partners, part of Hilco—as administrators. The BBC adds that MCR 'hired specialist liquidators Hilco to advise'. A 'parallel strategy' was applied of seeking a buyer for the chain as a going interest, and running closing-down sales.

On the evening of 27 November 2009, it was announced that a closing-down sale would commence in all stores on the following day. During the sales, sale stock included Denby China, a separate concern bought out by Valco Capital Partners earlier in 2009. The publisher Hachette successfully took MCR to court for continuing to sell Hachette titles without first obtaining permission, obtaining a High Court judgement on 18 December 2009 that MCR was 'incorrect' to do so.

MCR, the administrator for the chain, stated the intention of seeking a buyer. However, it was reported that a 'serious attempt' by Richard Joseph, co-founder of the Books Etc. chain, to buy a number of stores was rejected by MCR. A spokesman for MCR confirmed that unsuccessful bids had been made which had failed to meet expectations. MCR announced that the 45 stores would cease trading and close their doors permanently on 22 December, claiming that it had not been possible to sell the chain as a going concern. All staff members were made redundant on 24 December 2009. The company Borders (UK) Limited was dissolved in August 2011.

BOOKS etc
The BOOKS etc. name and its website and the Borders database were bought by Capital Books Ltd in January 2010. As of May 2022, Books Etc still operates as an independent family-run online business.

Awards
 Bookselling Chain of the Year 2005 & 2006
 Chain Bookselling Company of the Year 2006 & 2007
 Hachette Children's Retailer of the Year 2007
 Magazine Destination Retailer of the Year 2007
 Usborne Children's Bookseller of the Year 2008

See also
 Books in the United Kingdom

References

External links
 BOOKSetc

Bookshops of the United Kingdom
British subsidiaries of foreign companies
Bookstores established in the 20th century
Retail companies established in 1998
Retail companies disestablished in 2009
Companies that have entered administration in the United Kingdom
Defunct retail companies of the United Kingdom
1998 establishments in the United Kingdom